Anatoly is a common Russian and Ukrainian male given name, derived from the Greek name  Anatolios, meaning "sunrise." Other common Russian transliterations are Anatoliy and Anatoli. The Ukrainian transliteration is Anatoliy or Anatolii. The French version of the name is Anatole. Other variants are Anatol and more rarely Anatolio.

Saint Anatolius of Alexandria was a fifth-century saint who became the first patriarch of Constantinople in 451. 

Anatoly was one of the five most popular names for baby boys born in St. Petersburg, Russia, in 2004. One in every 35,110 Americans are named Anatoly and the popularity of the name Anatoly is 28.48 people per million.

The name of Anatolia – a region located to the east from the Greeks' point of view – shares the same linguistic origin.

People
 Anatoli Agrofenin (born 1980), Russian footballer
 Anatoli Aleksandrovich Grishin (born 1986), Russian footballer
 Anatoli Aslamov (born 1953), Russian football coach
 Anatoli Balaluyev (born 1976), Russian footballer
 Anatoli Bashashkin (1924–2002), Russian footballer
 Anatoli Blagonravov (1895–1975), Russian physicist
 Anatoli Bogdanov (born 1981), Russian footballer
 Anatoli Boisa (born 1983), Georgian basketball player
 Anatoli Boukreev (1958–1997), Russian climber
 Anatoli Bugorski (born 1942), Russian scientist
 Anatoli Bulakov (1930–1994), Soviet boxer
 Anatoly Bulgakov, Russian footballer
 Anatoly Chepiga (born 1979), Russian intelligence officer
 Anatoly Chubais (born 1955), Russian politician
 Anatoli Davydov (born 1953), Russian football coach
 Anatoly Demitkov (1926–2005), Soviet canoeist
 Anatoly Dobrynin (1919–2010), Russian politician
 Anatoli Droga (born 1969), Ukrainian judoka
 Anatoly Dyatlov (1931–1995), Russian nuclear engineer.
 Anatoli Fedotov (born 1966), Soviet ice hockey player
 Anatoli Fedyukin (born 1952), Russian handball player
 Anatoly Filipchenko (born 1928), Soviet cosmonaut
 Anatoli Firsov (1941–2000), Russian ice hockey player
 Anatoly Fomenko (born 1945), Russian mathematician
 Anatolii Horelik (1890–1956), Ukrainian activist
 Anatoli Ivanishin (born 1969), Russian cosmonaut
 Anatoly Karatsuba (1937–2008), Russian mathematician
 Anatoly Karpov (born 1951), Russian chess grandmaster (World Champion)
 Anatoli Nankov (born 1969), Bulgarian footballer and a coach
 Anatoly Onoprienko (1959–2013), prolific Ukrainian serial killer and mass murderer
 Anatoly Papanov (1922–1987), Soviet actor
 Anatoly Puzach (1941-2006), Soviet-Ukrainian former footballer and coach
 Anatoly Rasskazov (born 1960), Russian photographer and artist
 Anatoly Samoilenko (1938–2020), Russian mathematician
 Anatoly Shariy (born 1978), Ukrainian investigative journalist
 Anatoly Slivko (1938–1989), Soviet serial killer
 Anatoly Sobchak (1937–2000), Russian politician
 Anatoly Solonitsyn (1934–1982), Russian actor
 Anatoly Stessel (1848–1915), Russian military leader
 Anatoliy Tymoschuk (born 1979), Ukrainian footballer
 Anatoli Tarasov (1918–1995), Russian ice hockey player and coach
 Anatoly Vaneyev (1872–1899), Russian revolutionary

Fictional
 Anatoli Knyazev (also known as KGBeast), a fictional character appearing in DC Comics

Notes 

Given names
Given names of Greek language origin
Russian masculine given names
Ukrainian masculine given names